The Houston Film Critics Society Award for Best Original Score is an annual award given by the Houston Film Critics Society.

Winners

2000s

2010s

2020s

References
 Houston Film Critics Society website

Houston Film Critics Society
Film awards for best score